Stéphane Heulot (born 20 September 1971) is a former French road racing cyclist. Born in Rennes, Heulot wore the yellow jersey in the 1996 Tour de France during three stages.  He was the manager of French cycling team  between 2009 and 2013. He joined  in February 2014 as the team's Performance Development Director.

Major results

1992
1st, Stage 1, Étoile de Bessèges
1st, Stage 7, Paris–Nice
1994
1st, Circuit de la Sarthe
1996
 National Road race champion
1st, Cholet-Pays de Loire
1st, Trophée des Grimpeurs
1st, France Road Cycling Cup
1st, Prix de Callac
 Tour de France General Classification (GC) leader 3 stages
1998
1st, Polynormande
13th, Tour de France
1999
14th, Tour de France
2000
Tour du Limousin
1st, Overall
1st, Stage 2
1st, Prix de Callac

References

External links

1971 births
Living people
French male cyclists
Cyclists from Rennes